Showmance may refer to:

Showmance, a romance, often contrived, that develops between two individuals in theater, or on films and television series and reality shows for the running period of the show
"Showmance" (Glee), second episode of the American television series Glee
"Showmance", Episode 7 photoshoot on Topmodel, Cycle 2